The School of English is part of the Faculty of the Arts, Design & Media at Birmingham City University. The School offers a range of undergraduate and postgraduate courses, is home to the Research and Development Unit for English Studies.

History
The origins of the School of English can be traced back to the Department of English & Secretarial Studies in the Birmingham College of Commerce in the 1950s. In 1959, the department began offering the external University of London BA English degree. One of the graduates during this period was the celebrated novelist Jim Crace.

During the 1960s, the department became the Department of English & Foreign Languages in a Faculty of Arts & Social Sciences, and this became one of the constituent faculties when the City of Birmingham Polytechnic was formed in 1971.

During the 1980s, the department became the Department of English & Communication Studies in the Faculty of Health and Social Sciences. In 1985 the English degree was revised and renamed BA English Language & Literature. At the time this was one of the few single honours courses that allowed students to combine literary and linguistic study.

When polytechnics were given university status in 1992, Birmingham Polytechnic became the University of Central England in Birmingham. English and Communication Studies went their separate ways, Communication Studies to Art & Design, and English (now the School of English) to the Faculty of Computing & Information Studies, which was eventually renamed the Faculty of Computing, Information & English (CIE).

In 2004, the School joined the Faculty of Law & Social Sciences. Following a faculty reorganisation in the renamed Birmingham City University in 2007, the School of English found itself in the Faculty of Performance, Media & English (PME), before joining the Arts, Design & Media faculty (ADM) in 2014.

Courses

The school offers an integrated BA degree in English Language and Literature and has added pathways in Creative Writing and Drama. There is a postgraduate course in Writing, which sees the school’s work showcased in venues such as Foyles bookshop, the Royal Court Theatre and the Birmingham Conservatoire. The school is home to the Institute of Creative and Critical Writing, the activities of which both enrich the University’s creative writing courses, through its series of masterclasses and guest authors, and engage with the wider culture beyond the university, through its calendar of public events.

The school has made a return to every Research Assessment Exercise since 1996 and currently boasts scholars and writers   in all its constituent fields, whether literature, linguistics, drama or creative writing. There have been funded research projects from the Arts and Humanities Research Council and Engineering and Physical Sciences Research Council, and the work of members of the School features regularly in world-leading journals and publishing houses.

The school is home to the Research and Development Unit for English Studies (RDUES). Founded by Professor Antoinette Renouf and formerly at the Universities of Birmingham and Liverpool, RDUES carries out research in corpus linguistics and has developed the WebCorp Linguist's Search Engine.

Notable alumni
Frank Skinner – comedian
Jim Crace – novelist
Fiona Phillips – television presenter

References

External links 
School of English website
Research and Development Unit for English Studies website
WebCorp website
Institute of Creative and Critical Writing website

Education in Birmingham, West Midlands
Birmingham City University